Greg Mullavey (born Gregory Thomas Mulleavy Jr., September 10, 1939) is an American film and television actor who has had roles as Tom Hartman in the television series Mary Hartman, Mary Hartman and Carly's grandfather in iCarly. He has appeared on and off Broadway, and continues to act on  stage, having appeared in over a hundred theatre productions across North America.

Career
Mullavey was born in Buffalo, New York, and changed the spelling of his surname from Mulleavy so as to distinguish himself from his father, who had the same name. He appeared on television series including Storefront Lawyers, Blue Light, The Rockford Files, M*A*S*H, All in the Family, Bonanza, Family, Combat!, The Virginian, and Hawaii Five-O. He played Eddie Gallagher on Rituals, as well as Carly and Spencer's grandfather on iCarly.  Mullavey played Tom Hartman on the iconic 1970s comedy Mary Hartman, Mary Hartman, and Mule Canby in the TV miniseries Centennial. He played Biff in the Tales from the Darkside episode (2/12) "Monsters in my Room" (1985).

His movie credits include Bob & Carol & Ted & Alice (1969), C.C. and Company (1970), Raid on Rommel (1971), The Birdmen (1971), The Love Machine (1971), The Christian Licorice Store (1971), I Dismember Mama (1972), Stand Up and Be Counted (1972), The Single Girls (1974), The Disappearance of Flight 412 (1974), The Hindenburg (1975, as Herbert Morrison), and The Census Taker (1984).

Onstage, he appeared opposite Marlo Thomas in the 2015 New York debut of Joe DiPietro's play Clever Little Lies at the Westside Theatre.

Personal life
His father, Greg Mulleavy, played major league baseball for the White Sox and Red Sox and was a third base coach for the Brooklyn Dodgers and L.A. Dodgers.

Mullavey was married to actress Meredith MacRae from 1969 until 1987, when they divorced; they had one child, daughter Allison Mullavey. He never remarried but has lived with actor/writer Ariana Johns since 1999.

References

External links

1939 births
Living people
American male film actors
American male television actors
American male stage actors
20th-century American male actors
21st-century American male actors
Male actors from Buffalo, New York